Michael A. Lilly, Sr. is an American attorney who was Attorney General of Hawaii from 1984 to 1985.

Biography
Michael A. Lilly was born in Honolulu, Hawaii. He graduated from the McGeorge School of Law of the University of the Pacific in 1974 and was admitted to the Hawaii bar the next year. Lilly practiced in San Jose, California from 1979 to 1981, after which he was named First Deputy Attorney General in Hawaii. Lilly retired as a Captain in the United States Navy and served with the Navy during the Vietnam War.

Lilly was appointed state attorney general by Governor George Ariyoshi in June 1984.  Lilly returned to private practice in 1985, and was succeeded by First Deputy Attorney General Corinne Watanabe.

Bibliography

References

Living people
Hawaii Attorneys General
Hawaii lawyers
McGeorge School of Law alumni
People from Honolulu
Year of birth missing (living people)